Cordish may refer to:

Surname
 David S. Cordish (1940–), American real estate developer
 Paul L. Cordish (1909–2003), American politician
 Reed Cordish (1974–), American political adviser

Other
 The Cordish Companies, American real estate development company